The teams competing in Group 10 of the 2009 UEFA European Under-21 Championship qualifying competition are Bosnia and Herzegovina, France, Malta, Romania and Wales.

Standings

Key: Pts Points, Pld Matches played, W Won, D Drawn, L Lost, GF Goals for, GA Goals against, GD Goal difference

Matches

Goalscorers

1 goal
: Diabang Boubacar Daliba, Ozren Perić
: Yohan Cabaye, Serge Gakpé, Yoann Gourcuff, Dimitri Payet, Loïc Rémy, Mamadou Samassa
: Matthew Bartolo, Ryan Fenech, Ian Zammit
: Liviu Ganea, Claudiu Keserü, Clement Pălimaru, Cristian Scutaru, Cristian Sirghi, Bogdan Stancu
: Mark Bradley, Shaun MacDonald, Rhoys Wiggins, Mike Williams, Rhys Williams
Own goals
: Florian Marange
: Neal Eardley

Group Z
Under
Under
Under